Family Radio, also known by its licensee name Family Stations, Inc., is a non-profit, non-denominational, educational Christian radio network based in Franklin, Tennessee with network operations located in Alameda, California, United States. Established in 1958, Family Radio airs religious music and programming, both past and present, and is listener-supported.

Programming
Family Radio's music programming consists mainly of traditional Christian hymns and other genres within Christian music. For decades,  Family Radio avoided any types of Contemporary Christian Music and only played traditional. At some points they played small amounts of very light Christian songs from the 70's, but they avoided anything even moderately contemporary, even softer songs within that genre. In the past year, though, softer Contemporary Christian Music from recent years has been added and mixed in with the traditional music. Contemporary Artists being mixed in range from John Michael Talbot, Steve Green, Christine Wyrtson, to Casting Crowns, MercyMe, Chris Tomlin, among others. They play about 4 an hour.

One of Family Radio's oldest broadcasts was a telephone-talk program called Open Forum in which Harold Camping, the network's co-founder, president and general manager, responded to callers' questions and comments, as they relate to the Bible, and used the platform to promote his various end-time predictions. The program was finally cancelled not long after Camping's third failed "rapture-less" prediction and a stroke which he suffered in June 2011. Other programs that have aired on Family Radio over the years include the morning programs Rise and Rejoice and The Christian Home; Family Bible Reading Fellowship, a half-hour Bible reading program; Radio Reading Circle, featuring readings of Christian books; the overnight program Nightwatch; Echoes, which features recordings of sermons delivered by pastors from churches around the world); Music to Live By, an afternoon program; the nighttime program The Quiet Hours; Family Bible Study; and Beyond Intelligent Design. Family Radio also has broadcast programs and features from outside ministries, including Answers in Genesis, hosted by Ken Ham, as well as teaching programs hosted by James Montgomery Boice, Donald Barnhouse, John F. MacArthur, R.C. Sproul, John Piper, and Alistair Begg. Some of these ministries were reluctant to allow their programs to air on Family Radio until Harold Camping's programs no longer aired.

Support
Family Radio relies solely on listener-supported funding and donations, and is unaffiliated with any religious denomination.
Outside programming broadcast over the Family Radio network was limited as Camping considered the organized church apostate, and therefore devoid of God's Spirit and under Satan's control.

The listenership of Family Radio understandably declined after the failed 1994 prediction, but before long the organization was growing at a rate much higher than it had previously experienced. In 1958, Camping sold his construction business and, with the funds, purchased KEAR-FM in San Francisco. He then grew his broadcast empire so that by 1994 Family Radio comprised forty radio stations nationwide. Yet, from 1994 to 2009, it grew at an even faster rate than before; by the time of his second campaign, the organization boasted 216 AM and FM radio stations, along with two television channels.

With a growing national profile, the financial viability of the non-profit also grew. Financial strength hit a peak in 2007 when Family Radio reported $135 million in assets. As net assets declined from that point forward, listener contributions steadily increased. In 2008, total contributions were well over $15 million. 2009 saw an annual budget of $36.7 million with $117 million in assets and $18.4 million in contributions. IRS records also indicate that Family Radio employed 348 persons in 2009. In 2010 assets were down to $110 million while contributions rose to $18.7 million while the station maintained 346 employees.  In 2011 contributions fell to $17.2 million and assets dropped to $87.6 million, while the organization also lost 26 employees. By the end of 2011 the organizations assets had dropped to $29.2 million, and the next year was forced to take out a $30 million loan. In 2007, the year before the start of the 2011 campaign, Family Radio had its greatest level of assets. Upon the outset of the second campaign, the organizations assets dropped while contributions simultaneously rose indicating an increased level of spending by the organization, far surpassing the increase in income.

Politics
Family Radio does not discuss politics directly, campaign for political candidates, or endorse candidates or issues. Family Radio attempts to distance itself from political and social issues.

History
Originally founded by Richard H. Palmquist, with the assistance of Harold Camping and Lloyd Lindquist as fellow members of the initial Board of Directors, Family Radio began obtaining FM broadcasting licenses on commercial frequencies in 1959, and by 2006, was ranked 19th among top broadcast companies in number of radio stations owned.

In 1958, the radio broadcaster Richard Palmquist met Harold Camping and persuaded him to provide the financial backing needed for them to co-found Family Radio, joined with other individuals of Christian Reformed, Bible Baptist, and Conservative Christian Presbyterian churches to purchase an FM radio station in San Francisco, California, KEAR, then at 97.3 MHz, to broadcast traditional Christian Gospel to the conservative Protestant community and minister to the general public. With the primary purpose of broadcasting doctrines of Christianity reflective of the teachings of the Holy Bible, Family Radio remained independent, never merging with any particular church organization or church denominations. After months of preparations, Family Radio finally came on the air on Wednesday, February 4, 1959.  

Through the 1960s, as a ministry, both non-profit organization and non-commercial, Family Radio acquired six additional FM stations and seven other AM stations under guidelines established by the Federal Communications Commission (FCC). The flagship station for the network of both full-power and low-power translator stations is KEAR in San Francisco (now at 610 kHz, since 2005 at 106.9 MHz). Due to FCC rules regarding translator stations, the legal primary station for the translators was changed to KEAR-FM in Sacramento, after the former primary FM station in San Francisco was sold to CBS Radio.

With the sale of KEAR-FM to CBS Radio in 2005, broadcasts from San Francisco moved to an AM radio frequency.

Many program productions broadcast throughout the Family Radio station network were produced in the Oakland, California facilities. The production process involved pre-recording two weeks of broadcast programming on reel-to-reel tapes distributed to each local Family Radio station for broadcast on the specified date. Free broadcast time was provided by Family Radio to national fundamentalist and evangelical ministries—outside ministries' programs were sent in cassette and reel-to-reel tape formats to respective Family Radio stations for local broadcast. Popular network announcers and the programs they hosted included Jon Arthur (The Quiet Hours, Big Jon & Sparky, Radio Reading Circle); Omar Andeel (The Morning Clock); Harold Hall (The Christian Home); Ken Boone (Music to Live By); Bob Swenson (Transition); and Jerry Edinger (Nightwatch). Each local Family Radio station had local board operators providing world, national, and local news and weather at various intervals throughout the day; regular public service announcements and daily public affairs programming; and local traffic reports via phone call-in during morning and afternoon weekdays. Outside ministry programs included the Focus on the Family daily broadcasts, Freedom Under Fire, Unshackled!, Back to the Bible, Family News in Focus, Beyond Intelligent Design, and "Walk with the King" with Dr. Robert A. Cook. The latter program, originally known as The King's Hour, still airs today, although now often edited in places deemed incompatible with Camping's odd end-times and "apostate church" doctrinal stands.

By the late 1980s, programming was delivered via satellite, local news was taken off the stations in favor of a various national news from a Christian news source, and all but a few local announcements are produced at their Oakland, California facilities.

Beginning in the late 1990s, Family Radio began gradually dropping outside ministries because of doctrinal changes in the ministry. As board members left the ministry, they were not being replaced. Harold Camping's controversial teachings, as they were changing, became the focus of the entire ministry. Up until the late 1980s, Family Radio endorsed local church attendance but once Camping stated the church age was over, he went on to say that Christians should not be members or attend church services of any type. His actions led to mounting criticism from former supporters and led some Family Radio staff members to resign as well as some outside ministries and churches to leave the network. The loss of these programs from the Family Radio schedule gave Camping more airtime to express his teachings.

Most teaching programs were hosted by Camping himself up until June 2011; after Camping suffered a stroke, his programs were gradually phased out. These broadcasts continued to be aired on Family Radio in reruns until the network stopped airing them for good in late 2018.

Music broadcast by Family Radio in the 1960s and 1970s was typical of religious stations, commercial and non-commercial. Some commercial stations played Contemporary Christian Music (CCM) for a few hours a week, but in the 1980s, as commercial and some non-commercial Christian stations evolved to Contemporary formats, Family Radio remained with a mainly traditional music format composed of choir hymns, various Gospel singing groups such as the Bill Gaither Trio, Christian college choirs, instrumental orchestral hymn renditions from conductors such as Paul Mickelson and Ralph Carmichael, vocalists such as George Beverly Shea, Frank Boggs, Doug Oldham, Mahalia Jackson, John McGill, Dave Boyer, and others, and softer urban contemporary gospel songs. From the 1970s onward, Family Radio included a few selected tracks from some lighter contemporary Christian artists such as Maranatha, Pam Mark Hall, Nancy Honeytree, Cynthia Clawson, the New Creation Singers, Ken Medema, Michael Card, and Steve Green, among others. And starting in the late 2010s, Family Radio started playing a handful of Christian music recorded by singers and musicians such as Keith & Kristyn Getty, Fernando Ortega, Sovereign Grace Music, Sara Groves, Selah, and The Master's Chorale. As such, Family Radio maintains a balance in playing traditional and lighter contemporary music on its stations.

In the mid- to late 1970s there began a policy of not announcing the names of artists behind the music aired, forcing listeners to write to Family Radio asking for information about their favorite songs. Presently there is a daily playlist available on the Web site for both East Coast and West Coast broadcasts.

Family Radio's text publications continue to be based on the text of the authorized King James Bible. Prerecorded Bible readings broadcast over satellite, shortwave, radio frequencies and the internet are generally based on the Modern King James Bible.

Failed 2011 end times prediction

Leading up to May 2011, Family Radio spent millions of dollars to advertise the now-discredited 2011 end times prediction. According to the International Business Times in an article dated May 24, 2011, "Harold Camping has spent approximately $100 million to promote and advertise his May 21 Doomsday prediction."

Two days after the forecast "Rapture" failed to happen, A Bible Answer, a Bible teaching ministry who had been tired of the "Rapture" predictions, offered to buy 66 full-powered radio stations from Family Radio founder Harold Camping in an effort to get him to resign from preaching this doctrine. The offer came with a catch – they were not to take possession of the stations until October 22, the day after Camping's revised set-date for the end of the world. A Bible Answer's website called for Camping to resign from the Family Radio board, citing "the self-proclaimed expert on the Bible has brought reproach upon Christ, the Bible, and the church," and added "After taking the money of his supporters, let Harold give up all he has, to show he believes what he is preaching. He does not or else he would sell. It is time to get new leadership at Family Radio."

On August 3, 2011, the radio industry website Radio-Info.com reported that Family Radio was putting two of its full-powered FM stations up for sale. These stations were: WKDN in Camden, New Jersey (covering Philadelphia), and WFSI in Annapolis, Maryland (covering Baltimore and Washington, D.C.). The article indicated that the ministry may have sold the stations to pay off "operating deficits accumulated over the last several years". WFSI would be purchased in November 2011 by CBS Radio, which converted the station to a Spanish language dance music format under the WLZL call sign. Merlin Media, LLC struck a deal in December 2011 to acquire WKDN, which was relaunched with a talk format under the WWIQ call sign. WWIQ was later sold to Educational Media Foundation in late 2013, and became WKVP, a K-Love affiliate station.

In January 2012, Family Radio applied to the FCC to change the license of station WFME in Newark, New Jersey, near New York City, from non-commercial to commercial. The application quickly prompted conjecture from radio industry monitors that the station would soon be sold. The application was approved in February. Those rumors were confirmed on October 16, 2012, when it was announced that Family Stations would sell WFME to Atlanta-based Cumulus Media for an undisclosed price. A November message from Camping posted on the Family Radio website admitted, "Either we sell WFME or go off the air completely." The 94.7 signal would be relaunched as country-formatted station, WNSH. Shortly after 94.7's sale to Cumulus, Family Radio would purchase low-powered FM station WDVY in Mount Kisco, New York from Cumulus, which would soon after adopt Family Radio's programming and the WFME-FM callsign.

After 40 years on the air, WYFR, Family Radio's shortwave station located in Okeechobee, Florida, ceased operations on July 1, 2013. In December 2013, Radio Miami International, purchased the shortwave transmission complex and began broadcasting from there.

Harold Camping died from a fall on December 15, 2013, in his home in Alameda, California. His death was confirmed by an employee of the ministry.

Recent developments

Despite the decrease of stations owned by Family Radio, the ministry continues to recover from the effects of the failed end-times prediction. Tom Evans took over as president and general manager. In response to the popularity of smartphones and tablets, Family Radio introduced its very own app for use on such electronics. Family Radio also redesigned its Web site and introduced it in its new format in June 2014, and updated it again three years later. The Web site has received new features on occasion since, including podcasts.

On November 21, 2014, The Walt Disney Company announced it would sell WQEW in New York City to Family Radio for $12.95 million, part of Disney's decision to end terrestrial distribution of the Radio Disney format. The sale was approved on February 10, 2015, and the station returned on the air on February 27 as the new WFME (AM), thus giving Family Radio full coverage of the New York City metropolitan area for the first time in two years. Concurrent with the sale, the FCC converted WFME's broadcasting status from commercial to non-commercial.

During 2016, Family Radio moved its corporate offices and main studios from Oakland, where it had been based since the ministry's inception, to the adjacent East Bay city of Alameda, also near Oakland International Airport and the headquarters of the Oakland Raiders.

In September 2018, Family Radio announced it would no longer air programs featuring the voice of Harold Camping, and would no longer distribute literature of Camping's teachings. The decision was made as part of an effort to both move away from Camping's theology, and to reintroduce programs from outside ministries into the network's schedule. The changes went into effect on October 8, 2018.

Just a few years after its restructuring, Family Stations, Inc., announced on October 28, 2019, that it would be moving its headquarters from Alameda, California to Nashville, Tennessee. Dick Whitworth, the senior director of marketing for the network, explained to The Christian Post: "We want to be good stewards of our finances, the gifts from our listeners, and the gifts God has given us. The decision to move to Nashville was made primarily because of the cost of doing business in the Bay Area." Family Radio will, however, keep its satellite up-link facility in Alameda, California, with upgrades and improvements for the distribution of all of its network and local station produced programming. Construction on the new headquarters / broadcast facility was completed in January 2020.

Teachings and beliefs
Central to Camping's teaching was the belief that the Bible is the Word of God and completely true. However, he emphasized, this does not mean that each sentence in the Bible is to be understood only literally. Rather, the meaning of individual Biblical passages needs to be interpreted in the light of two factors. The first is the context of the Bible as a whole.  The second is its spiritual meaning: in Camping's words, "the Bible is an earthly story with a Heavenly meaning." In Camping's publication, "We are Almost There!", he stated that certain Biblical passages pointed unquestionably to May 21, 2011, as the date of "Rapture", and pointed to October 21, 2011, as the end of the world. This event did not occur on May 21 or October 21 of that year, and no acknowledgment of false teaching has yet been offered concerning the October 21 event. The organization's website became inaccessible early that day, and wasn't reachable until the early morning of May 22.

As a result of spending millions of dollars to promote his "end of the world" theory, many people sold everything they owned and donated it to Family Radio, sometimes even hundreds of thousands of dollars. The California Attorney General's office has been asked by the Freedom from Religion Foundation to investigate Camping and Family Stations, Inc. for "Fraud and Deceit".

After leaving the Christian Reformed Church in 1988, Camping taught doctrines that largely conflicted with doctrines of the Reformed Church and traditional Christian teaching. The principles of Biblical hermeneutics upon which Camping framed his present teachings are:

 The Bible alone is the Word of God.
 Every Biblical passage must be interpreted in the light of the Bible as a whole.
 The Bible normally conveys multiple levels of meaning or significance.
 Numerology cannot be applied to numbers in the Bible when following the Biblical rules—some individuals have attempted to apply the concept to Camping's research.
 That salvation is unmerited and cannot be achieved by good works, prayer, belief or acceptance. It is a pure act of God's grace and that those to be saved were chosen "before the foundation of the world". He added conditions to salvation and teaching relative free will of humanity. However, he admitted that some, though very few, could be saved, while still in the worldly churches, just as there would be those saved inside the nation of Israel, and that leaving the churches is something a believer should do, just as a believer should not lie or cheat. He also gave credit to God for what has been called "common grace", where the unsaved, the yet to be saved and the saved are blessed to do good works, but this is not considered the gift of salvation itself.

For several years after Camping's death in 2013, Family Radio continued to air some of his past broadcasts and distribute his literature. But in October 2018, Family Radio discontinued using any of Camping's commentary and content because "so much of it still contains elements that are very difficult." Tom Evans, president and general manager of Family Radio, explained that "Family Radio has come out of self-imposed isolation and we've repented from many of our former positions, date-setting the end of the world and all that, as well as the condemnation of the church".

Stations

Notes:

In addition to its full-powered stations, Family Radio is relayed by an additional 27 FM translators:

International
Family Radio can be heard in English from the following local international stations:

Satellite
Eutelsat Hotbird 6 – 13 degrees east, Transponder # 89, Vertical LNB polarization; Satellite frequency: 12.597 GHz
 Family Radio Europe (English): channel 8222
 Family Radio International 1: channel 8233
 Family Radio International 2: channel 8234

Astra 2B – 28.2° east, Transponder # 36, Vertical LNB polarization, Satellite frequency: 12.4024 GHz
 Family Radio Europe (English) : SID 9558

Until July 1, 2013, Family Radio also offered international coverage via short wave radio station WYFR in several languages; its short wave service ceased operations on July 1, 2013.

Television
 WNYJ-TV, West Milford – Newark, New Jersey – New York (Now defunct, previously broadcast religious programming as WFME-TV)

References

External links

American radio networks
 
Christian radio stations in the United States
International broadcasters
Christian mass media companies
Companies based in Oakland, California
Radio broadcasting companies of the United States
Radio stations established in 1994
1994 establishments in California